Menlo Park Terrace is an unincorporated community and census-designated place located within Woodbridge Township in Middlesex County, New Jersey, United States. It is located off U.S. Route 1 in between Menlo Park Mall and Woodbridge Center at Exit 130 of the Garden State Parkway.

See also
List of neighborhoods in Woodbridge Township, New Jersey
Neighborhoods in Perth Amboy, New Jersey
List of neighborhoods in Edison, New Jersey

References 

Neighborhoods in Woodbridge Township, New Jersey
Unincorporated communities in Middlesex County, New Jersey
Unincorporated communities in New Jersey